The Khanka spiny bitterling (Acanthorhodeus chankaensis) is a temperate freshwater fish belonging to the Acheilognathinae subfamily of the  family Cyprinidae.  It originates in the inland rivers in Asia, and is found in China, Korea, and Russia. It is currently the only known species in its genus.

It lives in a temperate climate in water with a pH of 7.0, a hardness of 15 DH, and a temperature range of 18 to 22 °C (64 to 72 °F). It is of commercial importance for fisheries and public aquaria.

When spawning, the female deposits the eggs inside bivalves. The young hatch and remain within the bivalve until they can swim.

References 

Acanthorhodeus
Freshwater fish of Japan
Fish of Korea
Fish described in 1872